808 State are an English electronic music group formed in 1987 in Manchester, taking their name from the Roland TR-808 drum machine. They were formed by Graham Massey, Martin Price and Gerald Simpson. They released their debut album, Newbuild, in September 1988 and secured commercial success in 1989, when their song "Pacific State" was picked up by BBC Radio 1 DJ Gary Davies and charted for 11 weeks in the UK.

The group's early work was a prominent influence on the UK's burgeoning acid house scene. AllMusic called them "one of the most important dance music acts of all time," and noted their influence on subsequent techno, IDM, and alternative dance artists.

History
Martin Price was the owner of Manchester's influential Eastern Bloc Records and was also the founder of the independent record label, Creed. Customers Graham Massey and Gerald Simpson joined with Price to form a hip hop group called Hit Squad Manchester. The group shifted to an acid house sound and recorded their debut Newbuild in 1988, while using the name 808 State for the first time.

Newbuild was released on Price's own record label. In an interview with Mojo magazine in 2005, Graham Massey explained that the album was recorded over the course of a winter weekend in January 1988 at Spirit Studios, Manchester. The album was named after a Bolton housing co-operative. The record was re-released in 2005 on Aphex Twin's Rephlex Records. Aphex Twin was a huge fan of the record: "It was the next step after Chicago acid, and as much as I loved that, I could relate much better to 808 State. It seemed colder and more human at the same time."

Around the same time, the band also recorded an acid house version of New Order's "Blue Monday". A favourite at The Haçienda's Hot Night, the recording was believed lost until Autechre's Sean Booth asked Massey to dig through his archive of old material. The record was released in 2004 by Rephlex Records. "We didn't put a lot of thought into it but maybe that's its charm," said Massey at the time.

Massey was also a member of the band Aqua in the early 1990s, along with the violinist Graham Clark, a former pupil of Manchester Grammar School.

The band's song "Pacific State" was released as a single, peaking at number 10 in the UK Singles Chart. Simpson left the group in 1989 to form his own solo project, A Guy Called Gerald. At this point, the remaining personnel enlisted DJs Andrew Barker and Darren Partington, known as the Spinmasters, and recorded the mini-album, Quadrastate in July 1989. The group signed to ZTT records, and Ninety was released in December 1989.

MC Tunes worked with the band on the 1990 album, The North at Its Heights. The album was a moderate success, reaching number 26 in the UK Albums Chart, and also saw a European and Japanese release. It spawned three UK singles, "The Only Rhyme That Bites" – featuring a sample of "The Big Country" performed by The City of Prague Philharmonic – (UK number 10), "Tunes Splits the Atom" (UK number 18) and "Primary Rhyming" (UK number 67). The first two issues credited MC Tunes versus 808 State, whilst the latter was simply MC Tunes. Tunes later returned in 1996 to work on a new track, "Pump", taken from 808 State's album Thermo Kings.

808 State's next album was released in 1991, Ex:el, which featured the vocals of Bernard Sumner and Björk. The songs included "In Yer Face" (UK #9), "Cubik" (UK #10) and "Lift" (UK #38).

In October 1991, Price left the group to perform solo production work, eventually forming his own label, Sun Text. The remaining members released a fourth album called Gorgeous, and after that, did some remix work for David Bowie, Soundgarden, and other performers, before returning with the album entitled Don Solaris in 1996. It featured contributions from James Dean Bradfield, who sang vocals on "Lopez", which reached number 20 in the UK Singles Chart. This song was remixed by Brian Eno. In 1997, they had remixed the Mansun track "Skin Up, Pin Up" for the Spawn soundtrack. The song "Bond" featured vocals by Mike Doughty from the band Soul Coughing and "Azura" featured Lou Rhodes from Lamb. They released a greatest hits compilation album, 808:88:98 in 1998. In 2000, Newbuild was re-released.

Some of the band's work, particularly in the albums Ex:el and Gorgeous show their new wave influences by sampling or featuring new wave icons such as Bernard Sumner on the song "Spanish Heart" and Ian McCulloch on "Moses". The song "Contrique" samples the bassline to Joy Division's "She's Lost Control" and "10 X 10" is a gospel-house track built on the foundation of The Jam's "Start!".

In 2003, they released Outpost Transmission which featured guest collaborations from Alabama 3 and Guy Garvey from Elbow.

In May 2008, the re-issue of the mini-album Quadrastate completed a trilogy of pre-ZTT releases on CD for the first time.

Partington left the band after being jailed for 18 months in January 2015 for dealing heroin and crack cocaine.

Barker died on 6 November 2021, leaving Massey as the sole remaining member of the group.

Musical style
808 State's style has been labeled as techno and house, and the band are regarded as "a pioneer of the acid house sound". The band's album, Newbuild, was influential in the development of the Madchester and baggy scenes.

Pseudonyms and side projects
Partington and Barker presented the 808 State Radio Show, first on Sunset 102 from 1989 to 1993, and later on Kiss 102 from 1994 to 1997. In 2012 they reinvented the program as the 808 State Webio Show for a number of months on Mike Joyce's internet based BeatWolf Radio. In 1990, 808 State composed the theme tune to the Channel 4 television programme, The Word.

808 State and its various members have recorded under a variety of pseudonyms. An early EP, containing the tracks "Massage-a-Rama" and "Sex Mechanic", was released under the name Lounge Jays. These tracks have since been re-released by Rephlex Records on the Prebuild LP. Another early EP, Wax on the Melt, was released under the name Hit Squad Mcr. This is the only release on which all five members of the group (Massey, Price, Simpson, Barker, and Partington) contributed simultaneously.

Massey released the solo album Subtracks under the name Massonix on Skam Records. He was a member of Biting Tongues, an experimental jazz rock group once signed to Factory Records. He also created the big band project called Massey's Toolshed Allstars (eventually shortened to Toolshed). Under the pseudonym Professor Vernon World, Massey as drummer/producer with the ladies combo organ quartet The Sisters of Transistors released an album, and is also a member of Sun Ra homage The Part-Time Heliocentric Cosmo Drama After School Club.

Price released a couple of EPs under the name Switzerland. He also managed the band Kaliphz (later known as Kaleef) who had a hit with a hip-hop cover version of The Stranglers "Golden Brown". Barker has produced a small number of tracks under the names Atlas and Benaco. Partington has recorded under the name Jeep.

Band members
 Graham Massey (born 4 August 1960, Manchester) — keyboards, programming, guitars, saxophone (1988–present)

Former members
 Gerald Simpson (born 16 February 1967) — keyboards (1988–1989)
 Martin Price (born 26 March 1955, Farnworth) — keyboards (1988–1991)
 Darren Partington (born 1 November 1969, Manchester) — keyboards, congas, electronic drums (1989–2015)
 Andy Barker (9 March 1968 – 6 November 2021) — keyboards, bass (1989–2021)

Discography

Studio albums
 Newbuild (1988)
 90 (1989)
 ex:el (1991)
 Gorgeous (1993)
 Don Solaris (1996)
 Outpost Transmission (2002)
 Transmission Suite (2019)

References

External links

Ian Peel: Warriors of Pop, 21 years of ZTT Record Collector, September 2004 (copy at Zang Tuum Tumb and all that) Article about ZTT's history, and contains information about 808 State
 
 History of the Pacific State https://www.soundonsound.com/people/classic-tracks-808-state-pacific-state

Acid house groups
Alternative dance musical groups
English electronic music groups
English house music groups
Madchester groups
Musical groups established in 1987
Musical groups from Manchester
Remixers
Rephlex Records artists
Tommy Boy Records artists
Warner Records artists
ZTT Records artists
1987 establishments in England